Ethan Mordden (born 1947) is an American author and musical theater researcher.

Biography
Mordden was born and raised in Pennsylvania, Venice, Italy, and on Long Island, New York.  He is a graduate of Friends Academy and the University of Pennsylvania. He first sought a career in show business, working as a music director on off-Broadway and in regional theatre, and enrolling in the BMI Lehman Engel Musical Theater Workshop run by Lehman Engel. As both composer and lyricist, Mordden wrote musicals based on William Shakespeare's Measure For Measure and on Max Beerbohm's Zuleika Dobson, but he ultimately ended up earning his living as a writer of English prose.  In the 1970s, he was assistant editor to Dorothy Woolfolk on DC Comics such as The Dark Mansion of Forbidden Love.

Works
His stories, novels, essays, and non-fiction books cover a wide range of topics including American musical theater, opera, film, and, especially in his fiction, the emergence and development of contemporary American gay culture as manifested in New York City. He has also written for The New Yorker, including three works of fiction, Critic At Large pieces on Cole Porter, Judy Garland, and the musical Show Boat, and reviews of a biography of the Barrymores and Art Spiegelman's graphic novel Maus. He later became a book reviewer for The Wall Street Journal.

His best-known fictional works are the interrelated series of stories known collectively as the "Buddies" cycle. In book form, these began with 1985's I have a Feeling We're not in Kansas Anymore.  The fifth in the series, 2005's How's Your Romance?, is subtitled Concluding the "Buddies" Cycle.  Together, the stories chronicle the times, loves, and losses of a close-knit group of friends, men who cope with the challenges of growing up and growing older.

Mordden’s 1995 novel How Long Has This Been Going On? follows the lives of a diverse group of men and women from 1949 to 1991 while moving from Los Angeles to the Midwest, then from San Francisco to the Northeast. All but one of the principal characters are gay or lesbian. Mordden's own favorite among his works of fiction is The Venice Adriana (1998), built around the life and art of the opera soprano Maria Callas. Mordden's A Bad Man Is Easy To Find, published in 1989 under the pseudonym of M. J. Verlaine is a series of interrelated short stories about the lives of women, and has only one minor gay character. In 2008, Mordden published The Jewcatcher, a surrealistic novel set in Berlin from the end of the Weimar Republic to the last day of the European war. The many principal characters are a combination of Mordden's inventions and real-life figures such as Adolf Hitler, Marlene Dietrich, Raoul Wallenberg, Claus von Stauffenberg, and President Paul von Hindenburg. In 2012, Mordden published his first volume of gay fiction in eight years, The Passionate Attention of an Interesting Man. In the form of a novella and four short stories, the book explores relationships in which one man dominates another. In 2015, Mordden returned to writing historical fiction with One Day in France, set in Limoges and Oradour-Sur-Glane when the latter, a peaceful village, was destroyed and its inhabitants brutally murdered by a squad of the Nazi Schutzstaffel. In 2021, Mordden published another novel, You Can't Be Too Young or Too Pretty, a black comedy about a murder cult preying on college students in an unnamed American town.

Mordden's nonfiction includes seven volumes detailing the history of the Broadway musical from the 1920s through the 1970s (followed by an eighth volume going up to 2003 in a different style from the seven-title series), guides to orchestral music and operatic recordings, and a cultural history of the American 1920s entitled That Jazz. He has also published Demented, an examination of the phenomenon of the operatic diva, and a coffee-table book on the works of Rodgers and Hammerstein.  His 2012 book Love Song: The Lives of Kurt Weill and Lotte Lenya is a dual biography chronicling the romance and professional collaboration of Kurt Weill and Lotte Lenya, and in 2013 he published Anything Goes: A History of American Musical Theatre. He has written a number of books on film, including analyses of the influence of Hollywood studios and of the role of female film stars.

The New York Times spoke of Mordden as being among a group of "ruminators on popular culture" animated by "the gun-moll gesticulations of Pauline Kael, for whom responsiveness was everything."

Selected bibliography
Buddies series
 I have a Feeling We're Not in Kansas Anymore: Tales from Gay Manhattan, 1985
 Buddies, 1986
 Everybody Loves You: Further Adventures in Gay Manhattan, 1988
 Some Men Are Lookers, 1997
 How's Your Romance?, 2005
Broadway
 Make belief: the Broadway musical in the 1920s, 1997
 Sing for your supper: the Broadway musical in the 1930s, 2005
 Beautiful mornin': the Broadway musical in the 1940s, 1999 
 Coming up roses: the Broadway musical in the 1950s, 1998
 Open a new window: the Broadway musical in the 1960s, 2001
 One more kiss: the Broadway musical in the 1970s, 2003
 The Happiest Corpse I've Ever Seen: The Last Twenty-Five Years of the Broadway Musical, 2004 
 All That Glittered: The Golden Age of Drama on Broadway 1919–1959, 2007
 Gays on Broadway, 2023
Works on musical theatre
 The American Theatre, 1967
 Better Foot Forward: The History of American Musical Theater, 1976
 That Jazz!: An Idiosyncratic Social History of the American Twenties, 1978
 The Hollywood Musical, 1981
 Broadway Babies: The People Who Made the American Musical, 1983
 The Fireside Companion to the Theatre, 1988
 Rodgers & Hammerstein, 1999
 Ziegfeld: The Man Who Invented Show Business, 2008
 On Sondheim: An Opinionated Guide, 2015
 When Broadway Went to Hollywood, 2016 
 All That Jazz: The Life and Times of the Musical Chicago, 2018
 On Streisand: An Opinionated Guide, 2019
 Broadway Musicals On CD: A Conversational Guide, 2022
Works on opera and classical music
 Opera in the Twentieth Century: Sacred, Profane, Godot, 1978
 A Guide to Opera Recordings, 1980
 A Guide to Orchestral Music, the Handbook for Non-Musicians, 1980
 The Splendid Art of Opera: A Concise History, 1980
 Demented: The World of the Opera Diva, 1984
 Opera Anecdotes (Oxford Paperbacks), 1988
 The New Book of Opera Anecdotes, 2020
Works on Hollywood
 Movie Star: A Look at the Women Who Made Hollywood, 1983
 The Hollywood Studios, 1988

Other published works
 Smarts, the cultural I.Q. test, 1984
 Pooh's workout book, 1984
 The Jewcatcher, 2008
 The Guest List: How Manhattan Defined American Sophistication---from the Algonquin Round Table to Truman Capote's Ball, 2010
 Love Song: The Lives of Kurt Weill and Lotte Lenya, 2012
 The Passionate Attention of an Interesting Man, 2013
 One Day in France, 2015
 You Can't Be Too Young or Too Pretty, 2021

References

External links
 Jorden, James, "Gay Sensibility:  Talking to Ethan Mordden", parterre box.  Retrieved October 20, 2006.
 Biography
 Ethan Mordden Papers. Yale Collection of American Literature, Beinecke Rare Book and Manuscript Library.

Living people
20th-century American novelists
21st-century American novelists
American male novelists
American gay writers
1949 births
20th-century American male writers
21st-century American male writers
Algonquin Round Table